Robert Matzie (born September 22, 1968) is a Democratic member of the Pennsylvania House of Representatives for District 16 and was elected in 2008.

Committee assignments 

 Committee On Ethics
 Consumer Affairs, Democratic Chair

References

External links
Pennsylvania House of Representatives - Robert Matzie (Democrat) official PA House website
Pennsylvania House Democratic Caucus - Robert Matzie official Party website

Living people
Democratic Party members of the Pennsylvania House of Representatives
People from Ambridge, Pennsylvania
Point Park University alumni
21st-century American politicians
1968 births